Marvin A. Stout (August 6, 1915 – December 12, 1991) was an American professional basketball player. He appeared in one game for the Indianapolis Kautskys while the team played in the National Basketball League (1939–40 season) and scored two points.

References

1915 births
1991 deaths
American men's basketball players
United States Navy personnel of World War II
Ball State Cardinals men's basketball players
Basketball players from Indiana
Indianapolis Kautskys players
Guards (basketball)
People from Pulaski County, Indiana